Darevskia dryada,  the Charnali lizard, is a lizard species in the genus Darevskia. It is found in Georgia and Turkey.

References

Darevskia
Reptiles described in 1997
Taxa named by Ilya Darevsky
Taxa named by Boris S. Tuniyev